Huỳnh Như (born 28 November 1991) is a Vietnamese footballer who plays as a forward for Liga BPI club Vilaverdense and the Vietnam women's national team. She had won five times Vietnamese Women's Golden Ball.

Career
She began her career with the local club Hồ Chí Minh City I W.F.C., making her debut in 2007, where she became an instrument of the club's domination in the semi-professional National League. She played 84 games, scored 62 goals as her club crowned champions on five seasons.

In August 2022, she wrote history as the first Vietnamese female footballer to go play professional abroad in Europe, by signing for the Portuguese club Vilaverdense in the Portuguese Campeonato Nacional Feminino.

Career statistics

Club

International goals

Individual
Vietnamese Women's Golden Ball: 2016, 2019, 2020, 2021, 2022
Vietnamese Women's Silver Ball: 2018
Vietnamese Women's Bronze Ball: 2015, 2017
Vietnamese Women's Football Championship Top scorer: 2013, 2016, 2017, 2021
Vietnamese Women's Football Championship Best of the tournament: 2018, 2019, 2020, 2021
Women's Vietnamese Cup Best of the tournament: 2020, 2021

Medal
 Labor Order 2nd Class: 2022

References

1991 births
Living people
Women's association football forwards
Vietnamese women's footballers
Vietnam women's international footballers
Asian Games competitors for Vietnam
Footballers at the 2018 Asian Games
Southeast Asian Games gold medalists for Vietnam
Southeast Asian Games medalists in football
Competitors at the 2017 Southeast Asian Games
Southeast Asian Games silver medalists for Vietnam
Competitors at the 2013 Southeast Asian Games
21st-century Vietnamese women
Vietnamese expatriate footballers
Expatriate footballers in Portugal